is a railway station in Shimizu, 

Kamikawa District, Hokkaidō, Japan.

Lines
Hokkaido Railway Company
Nemuro Main Line Station K24

Adjacent stations

Railway stations in Hokkaido Prefecture
Railway stations in Japan opened in 1907